Urs Ernst Schwarzenbach, CStJ (born 1948) is a UK-based Swiss financier. In May 2020, the Sunday Times estimated his net worth at £978 million.

Early life
Urs Schwarzenbach was born in Thalwil in 1948, and raised in Küsnacht. He is the son of a print shop owner.

Career

Schwarzenbach set up Interexchange, the largest foreign exchange dealership in Switzerland. Through its success, he has bought well over £300m of property in the UK,  in Australia, a palace in Morocco, £17m of assets in the aviation field and the Grand Hotel Dolder in Zürich. He has his own polo team, the Black Bears, which has some 600 ponies, with 350 in Australia and 250 in the UK.

He backed the racing-themed restaurant Café Grand Prix in Mayfair, London, but this went into liquidation in 2004. In 2005, Schwarzenbach was estimated to be worth around £900m but, according to The Sunday Times Rich List 2012, he was ranked 87th with an estimated worth of circa £850m.

In 2007, Schwarzenbach outbid other foreign buyers to acquire Culham Court, a  riverside estate downstream of Henley-on-Thames on the Berkshire bank. Schwarzenbach bought the estate from Paddy and Annabel Nicoll for £35 million. Mrs Nicoll's father is Sir Martyn Arbib, former head of the Perpetual fund management company, who bought the estate as a wedding present for her in 1997 for £12 million. Coincidentally, Culham's connections with the world of finance run deeper still; Arbib acquired the property from Felicity Behrens, wife of the banker Michael Behrens, who lived there for nearly half a century from 1949 to 1996.

Schwarzenbach's development of the Culham Court estate still continues with the extension of the existing  deer park with over 4 kilometres of wrought iron deer fencing, a mile long "London" drive through beech woodland to the main road, the 2010 £8 million acquisition of three cottages and the original walled gardens which will be reinstated to provide fresh fruit and vegetables for the main house, a new ha-ha, and a security system including a "hard" room.

The latest creation is a maze requiring the planting of 20,000 mature yew bushes; this part of the 20-year plan that has been devised for the gardens and grounds. Another property acquired for £2m in 2010, and situated on raised ground that overlooks Culham Court, has been demolished and Culham Chapel was built in its place. Symm, the Oxford-based building company undertaking all the work on the Culham estate, now sponsors the Hambleden Horse Trials.

In 2008, it was reported in the press that Schwarzenbach had bought nearby Fawley Court for £22 million. Another substantial riverside property on the outskirts of Henley-on-Thames and once owned in the nineteenth century by a Scottish banker, it was sold in controversial circumstances by the Congregation of Marian Fathers, a Polish religious community which had no further use for it. During 2012, extensive building works continue on the main house yet again with Symms continuing to be the main beneficiary of the contract and work at the two lodges adjacent to the A4130 at the main entrance to the "London drive" are being completed after well over a year and some interesting underground developments. In 2012 the Schwarzenbachs revoked their consent for the permissive footpath that had run alongside the Thames in front of Culham Court as part of the Thames Path for many years.

Schwarzenbach has paid for the high and low voltage overhead electricity network within the boundaries of Culham estate to be placed underground.

VAT fraud and art trafficking with Galerie Gmurzynska
In 2013/14, Schwarzenbach was investigated by the FCA (Federal Customs Administration) for alleged VAT fraud totalling some ten million Swiss francs and art trafficking. Under Swiss law, owners of artworks do not have to pay import charges until works of art are formally brought into the country, i.e. they come out of storage and are officially transferred. On Tuesday 16 April 2013, Schwarzenbach's Hotel Dolder in Zurich, which had been displaying a lavish art collection, was raided by Swiss customs officials. This action was simultaneous with a raid on nearby Galerie Gmurzynska on the suspicion of supplying the five-star Hotel Dolder with imported artworks valuing 75M Swiss Francs without paying duty.

The Swiss authorities seized a large number of documents during their raid. Gmurzynska filed a complaint to prevent their inspection, but the Federal Court has ruled that in a criminal investigation of this kind where there is reasonable suspicion, the prosecuting FCA can demand to see papers it considers relevant to the case.

The case has been covered in several international outlets including 'Die Welt'.

In October 2016 the Swiss Customs Directorate finalised a compelling case that Schwarzenbach in effect had legally exported artefacts for a value of at least 130 million CHF and smuggled them back into Switzerland. Schwarzenbach eventually admitted the charge and also accepted to pay the VAT amounting to ten million CHF. However, by October 2016 he was still objecting to pay the fine of 4 million Swiss francs.

Dolder Grand Hotel

He owns the Dolder Grand, a 5-star Zurich hotel, which cost him SFr 440 million.

Australian property
Schwarzenbach owns about 50,000 hectares of farmland in New South Wales, Australia, through his Romani Pastoral Company. Most of this is between Harden and Jugiong, and includes the polo estate Garangula, as well as Redbank, a house once owned by the impresario Robert Stigwood.

Morocco
He bought part of Palais Layadi, a 19th-century palace set in a 4,000 square meter compound in Marrakech, since at least 2008.The main parts of Palais Layadi (Palais Soleiman) which include the reception area still belong to the moroccan Segueni's family.

Philanthropy
Schwarzenbach has supported the internal and external refurbishment of the Venerable English College in Rome, as well as its engagement of a research fellow and project archivist.

Personal life
Schwarzenbach lives at Culham Court near Henley-on-Thames and sponsored the rowing gallery of the River and Rowing Museum in Henley which is named after him. He owns other estates and farms in England, a 10,000 acre sporting estate in Scotland and the largest country estate on the Isle of Wight.

His wife, Francesca Schwarzenbach-Mulhall, is a former Miss Australia, born in Sydney, and is a godmother of Lady Louise Windsor, the daughter of the Duke of Edinburgh.

The couple have two children. Their daughter Sascha is married to Irish Olympian Clifton Wrottesley, 6th Baron Wrottesley. They live in St Moritz, Switzerland, and London, England, and have four children.

References

1948 births
Living people
Swiss billionaires
Swiss businesspeople
Swiss people of German descent
People from Thalwil
British businesspeople
Commanders of the Order of St John
Swiss emigrants to the United Kingdom